Carmen Scarpitta (26 May 1933 – 26 April 2008) was an Italian stage and film actress. She appeared in 30 films between 1960 and 2001.

Scarpitta was born in Hollywood, California. She debuted on stage in 1960 in Alessandro Manzoni's Adelchis and in Ennio Flaiano's A Martian in Rome, both directed by Vittorio Gassman. During her 40-year career she worked on stage with Carmelo Bene, Luca Ronconi and Luigi Squarzina, and starred in films directed by Federico Fellini, Bernardo Bertolucci, Mauro Bolognini and Luigi Magni.

She died from a gas leak in her house in Cabo San Lucas, Mexico.

Theatre
Adelchi of Alessandro Manzoni, directed by Vittorio Gassman, (1960).
Oresteia of Aeschylus, directed by Vittorio Gassman, (1960).
Un marziano a Roma of Ennio Flaiano, directed by Vittorio Gassman, (1960).
Right You Are (if you think so) of Luigi Pirandello, directed by Mario Ferrero, (1964).
L'attenzione of Alberto Moravia, directed by Edmo Fenoglio, (1967).
Visita alla prova de L'isola purpurea, di Mikhail Bulgakov, directed by Raffaele Maiello, (1968).
La vita comincia ogni mattina, of Terzoli & Vaime, directed by Pietro Garinei, (1981).

Filmography

References

External links

1933 births
2008 deaths
Italian film actresses
American emigrants to Italy
Actresses from Hollywood, Los Angeles
People from Cabo San Lucas
Accademia Nazionale di Arte Drammatica Silvio D'Amico alumni
Italian stage actresses
Italian television actresses
20th-century American women
21st-century American women